B! Machine is a synthpop band from San Francisco, California.

The band was formed in 1996, consisting of the sole founding member, writer and musician, Nathaniel Leigh Nicoll. The current line-up of the band varies but typically consists of Nathaniel Nicoll, Mike Hayden, and James Wong. The meaning behind the name B! Machine has been veiled behind cryptic remarks since its inception.

History
Nicoll formed Doctors With Knives with Mike Hayden after the singer for a prior band "left unexpectedly." After a number of limited releases, Nicoll released Dorlotez-vous on cassette tape as Halflife before forming B! Machine.

1996–2000
B! Machine's first project, Must Kill, was recorded in 1996-97. This debut, however, was shelved and left uncirculated until after the release of B! Machine's second full-length project Aftermath, which was distributed by A Different Drum in 1998. Following on the heels of Aftermath, B! Machine signed with A Different Drum. In 1999, they released the full-length CD Infinity Plus which featured production by Jarkko Touhimaa of Neuroactive. Infinity Plus, which spawned the singles "Temple" and "Opal", was well received, with the album peaking at #25 and the "Opal" CD5 peaking at #26 on the CMJ RPM Charts in the U.S.

2001–2009
In the 2000s, B! Machine released three full studio albums: Hybrid, The Evening Bell, and Falling Star. A special 4-disc box set of Falling Star was also released. A collection of alternate versions of previous songs was released as Alternates and Remixes. In addition, a 6-disc anthology of B! Machine songs was released as The Machine Box.

2021–2022
In March 2021, the B! Machine website came back online at a new domain name, announcing a forthcoming full-length album entitled Snake Charm Girl would drop in the spring of 2022. "Half The Time", the first digital-only single celebrating the album, was released March 22, 2022 on Bandcamp.  Snake Charm Girl was released digitally on August 5th, 2022 through Bandcamp with a limited edition double CD available from Poponaut.

Discography

Albums
 Aftermath (1998)
 Infinity Plus (1999)
 Hybrid (2001)
 Alternates And Remixes (2002)
 Machine Box (2002)
 Machine Box (Disc Six - Bonus Disc) (2004)
 The Evening Bell (2004)
 The Evening Bell (Limited Edition 4-Disc Set) (2005)
 The Falling Star (2007)
 Snake Charm Girl (2022)

Singles
 Temple (1999)
 Opal (2000)
 Opal (Limited 2 CD Edition) (2000)
 Umbrella (2001)
 Angels (2004)
 Forget (2005)
 The Other Girl (2009)
 A Certain Sadness (February, 2010)
 Half The Time (2022)

References

External links
 
 Houston Press Interview/Tour Review
 B! Machine at Discogs
 B! Machine at Last.fm

American synth-pop groups
Musical groups from San Francisco
American new wave musical groups
Musical groups established in 1996